Dolomedes tenebrosus or dark fishing spider is a fishing spider found in the USA and Canada.

It is able to bite humans but will run from people. In most cases, the bite is no more severe than a bee or wasp sting.

Description

Female bodies are 15–26 mm; males are 7–13 mm. Legs range from 50–90 mm. The spider is a pale to dark brown colour with several chevron markers and lighter stripes around its legs. It is similar to D. scriptus. The legs are banded with brown/black annulations on the femora and reddish-brown/black annulations on the tibia.

Habitat
They are found in wooded areas and dwell on trees.

References

Further reading
 Bishop, S.C. (1924). A revision of the Pisauridae of the United States. New York St. Mus. Bull. 252: 1-140.
 Carico, J.E. (1973). The Nearctic species of the genus Dolomedes (Araneae: Pisauridae). Bull. Mus. comp. Zool. Harv. 144: 435-488.
 Carico, J.E. & P.C. Holt. (1964). A comparative study of the female copulatory apparatus of certain species in the spider genus Dolomedes (Pisauridae: Araneae). Tech. Bull. agric. Exp. Stat. Blacksburg Virg. 172: 1-27.
 Comstock, J.H. (1940). The spider book. Revised and edited by W. J. Gertsch. Cornell Univ. Press, Ithaca, xi + 727 pp.
 Comstock, J.H. (1912). The spider book; a manual for the study of the spiders and their near relatives, the scorpions, pseudoscorpions, whipscorpions, harvestmen and other members of the class Arachnida, found in America north of Mexico, with analytical keys for their classification and popular accounts of their habits. Garden City, New York, pp. 1–721
 Dondale, C.D. & J.H. Redner. (1990). The insects and arachnids of Canada, Part 17. The wolf spiders, nurseryweb spiders, and lynx spiders of Canada and Alaska, Araneae: Lycosidae, Pisauridae, and Oxyopidae. Research Branch, Agriculture Canada, Publ. 1856: 1-383.
 Emerton, J.H. (1909). Supplement to the New England Spiders. Trans. Connect. Acad. Arts Sci. 14: 171-236.
 Hentz, N.M. (1844). Descriptions and figures of the araneides of the United States. Boston J. Nat. Hist. 4: 386-396.
 Kaston, B.J. (1948). Spiders of Connecticut. Bull. Conn. St. geol. nat. Hist. Surv. 70: 1-874.
 Montgomery, T.H. (1902). Descriptions of Lycosidae and Oxyopidae of Philadelphia and its vicinity. Proc. Acad. nat. Sci. Philad. 54: 534-592.
 Paquin, P. & N. Dupérré. (2003). Guide d'identification des araignées du Québec. Fabreries, Suppl. 11 1-251.
 Sierwald, P. (1990). Morphology and homologous features in the male palpal organ in Pisauridae and other spider families, with notes on the taxonomy of Pisauridae (Arachnida: Araneae). Nemouria (Occas. Pap. Delaware Mus. nat. Hist.) 35: 1-59.
 Sierwald, P. (1989). Morphology and ontogeny of female copulatory organs in American Pisauridae, with special reference to homologous features (Arachnida: Araneae). Smithson. Contrib. Zool. 484: 1-24.
 Sierwald, P. & J.A. Coddington. (1988). Functional aspects of the male palpal organ in Dolomedes tenebrosus, with notes on the mating behavior (Araneae, Pisauridae). J. Arachnol. 16: 262-265.

External links

 Dolomedes tenebrosus, GBIF

tenebrosus
Spiders of North America
Spiders described in 1844